Yeniçiftlik is a village in the Biga District of Çanakkale Province in Turkey. Its population is 1,090 (2021). Before the 2013 reorganisation, it was a town (belde).

References

Villages in Biga District